The 2015 season for the Los Angeles Sparks of the Women's National Basketball Association began on June 6.

Transactions

WNBA Draft

Trades

Roster

Season standings

Schedule

Preseason

Playoffs

Statistics

Regular season

References

External links
THE OFFICIAL SITE OF THE LOS ANGELES SPARKS

Los Angeles Sparks seasons
Los Angeles
Los Angeles Sparks